Coleophora vibicella is a moth of the family Coleophoridae found in Europe.

Description
The wingspan is 16–24 mm. Adults are yellowish with white markings. They are on wing in August in western Europe.

The larvae feed on Chamaespartium sagittale, dyer's greenweed (Genista tinctoria) and vetches (Vicia species). They create a large shining black tubular silken case of about 19 mm long. The mouth angle is about 60°. The end of the case is strongly rolled in. Full-grown larvae can be found at the end of June.

Distribution
Coleophora vibicella is found in Europe south of the line running from Great Britain to Ukraine. It has not been recorded from Ireland and the Balkan Peninsula.

References

vibicella
Moths described in 1813
Moths of Europe
Taxa named by Jacob Hübner